Hwang So-hee (born April 7, 1988), known by her stage name DJ Soda, is a South Korean DJ. Hwang has built her reputation on being a frequent headliner for several Asian music festivals, including "S20 Songkran Musical Festival".

Career

2013–2017: Beginnings as a DJ 
Hwang began work as a DJ in June 2013. Hwang began majorly touring with the Korea World DJ festival in 2015.

In June 2016, Hwang released her debut EP Closer through Warner Music Group. She also collaborated with labelmates Sistar.

In 2017, Hwang performed at the "S20 Songkran Music Festival" in Bangkok, Thailand, considered one of the world's top three music festivals.

2018–present 
In 2018, Hwang joined Starship Entertainment's new sublabel, "House of Music". She was later moved to another of Starship's sublabels, Highline Entertainment, as the earlier sublabel became defunct. In June, Hwang participated in "Ultra Music Festival Korea" (UMF). 
In July, she released a song in collaboration with Walshy Fire, titled "Never Let You In", which topped charts in Singapore, Malaysia, Hong Kong, and Indonesia.

In 2019, Hwang participated in Typhoon 8, a musical festival in Singapore. In December, Hwang performed at World Club Dome: Snow Edition held at the Jungfraujoch railway station in Switzerland.

In December, Hwang was awarded the culture prize in the indie category for the 9th Korea Hallyu Awards.

In April 2020, Hwang collaborated with Psycho Boys Club for the single "Over You". In November, Hwang collaborated with Kryoman and 1st Klase to release the song "Holding Back" featuring KYE. In 2019, she released a remix of the song by DJ Lost Chameleon.

In June 2020, she participated in Electric Blockaloo, a dance music livestream. In November, Hwang took part in her label Highline Entertainment's special performance The Color. She also released a single, "Shooting Star", on June 26.

In August 2021, she released a new single, "Okay!", with Lost Chameleon and Ahin of Momoland.

In November, DJ Soda ended her exclusive contract with Highline Entertainment.

Philanthropy 
On March 8, 2022, she donated  million won to the Hope Bridge Disaster Relief Association to help the victims of a massive wildfire that started in Uljin, Gyeongbuk and had spread to Samcheok, Gangwon. It was later extinguished on March 15, 2022.

Discography

Extended plays

Singles

Awards and nominations

References 

Starship Entertainment artists
South Korean DJs
Living people
1986 births